Scytodoidea is a taxon of araneomorph spiders, at the rank of superfamily. It contains four families:
 Drymusidae
 Periegopidae
 Scytodidae
 Sicariidae

Phylogeny
The monophyly of the group has been confirmed in morphological studies. One hypothesis for the relationships of the four families is shown in the following cladogram:

Earlier studies agree in placing the Sicariidae as the most basal family, but reverse the positions of Drymusidae and Scytodidae. Scytodoidea is placed within the haplogyne clade of araneomorph spiders, as one of the more derived clades.

References

 
Arachnid superfamilies